Diego Martins may refer to:

 Diego Martins (footballer, born 1983), Brazilian football midfielder
 Diego Martins (footballer, born 1987), Brazilian football midfielder

See also
 Diego Martin (disambiguation)
 Dhiego Martins (born 1988), Brazilian football forward